Shoulder pads may refer to:

 Shoulder pads (fashion)
 Shoulder pads (sport), particularly gridiron football